Super Story is a Nigerian anthology television drama series created by Wale Adenuga who published the magazine on which the programme is based. The series originally aired on Thursdays by 8 pm on NTA; currently, Super Story is shown on NTA and Wap TV every Thursday by 8 pm and airs on several other terrestrial and cable networks at a later time.

List of series

Awards 
It won the best television series at the Nigerian Broadcasters Merit Awards in 2016.

References

Nigerian drama television series
2000s Nigerian television series
2010s Nigerian television series
Television shows set in Nigeria
Nigerian Television Authority original programming